The Texas Air Museum currently has two locations:
 Stinson Municipal Airport (San Antonio)
 City of Slaton/Larry T. Neal Memorial Airport

Slaton Location Gallery

References

External links

Texas Air Museum - San Antonio site
Texas Air Museum - Slaton site

Aerospace museums in Texas
Museums in San Antonio
Museums in Lubbock County, Texas